Dinsdale is a surname. It originates from two villages in Country Durham in England. Lower and Upper Dinsdale. It means Danes (Vikings) Dale (Valley) but specifically relates to the two villages. Dinsdale:Vikings Valley.Notable people with the surname include:

George Dinsdale, British-born Canadian politician
Bruce George Peter Lee (born as Peter George Dinsdale; 1960), prolific British serial killer, arsonist, and mass murderer
Reece Dinsdale, British actor
Shirley Dinsdale, American ventriloquist
Tim Dinsdale, filmed footage supposedly of the Loch Ness Monster
Walter Dinsdale, Canadian politician